Kajjansi is a town in Central Uganda. It is one of the urban centers in Wakiso District.

Location
The township is situated on the tarmacked, all-weather Kampala - Entebbe Road. The coordinates of Kajjansi are:0°12'54.0"N, 32°33'00.0"E (Latitude:0.2150; Longitude:32.5500).

Population
In 2006, the population of Kajjansi was estimated at about 7,53 0.

Points of interest
The following points of interest lie within the town limits or close to the edges of town:

 Uganda Clays Limited - The headquarters and main factory are located in Kajjansi
 Kajjansi Airport - A private civilian airport belonging to Mission Aviation Fellowship
 A branch of Equity Bank
 Kajjansi Roses - A horticultural company; a member of the Madhvani Group of Companies
 Headquarters of the Rotary Club of Kajjansi, Uganda. Club Number:61815
 Kajjansi Aquaculture Research Station - A government fisheries research and training center
 Palliative Care Association of Uganda (PCAU) 
 Sunfish Farms Limited - A private fish farm
 Kajjansi Central Market

See also

References

External links
 Overview of Aquaculture in Uganda

Populated places in Central Region, Uganda
Cities in the Great Rift Valley
Populated places on Lake Victoria
Wakiso District